Eacles callopteris is a moth in the family Saturniidae. It is found in Bolivia, Ecuador and Peru. It is very similar in appearance to Eacles acuta.

References

Ceratocampinae
Moths described in 1907